Wilson Nunes Martins (born May 17, 1953, in Santa Cruz do Piauí, Piauí) is a Brazilian politician and member of the Brazilian Socialist Party (PSB). He served as Governor of Piauí from April 1, 2010, to April 2, 2014.

References

1953 births
Governors of Piauí
Vice Governors of Piauí
Members of the Legislative Assembly of Piauí
Brazilian Socialist Party politicians
Living people